Kozana is a village in the Municipality of Brda in the Littoral region of Slovenia.

The parish church in the village is dedicated to Saint Jerome and belongs to the Koper Diocese.

References

External links

Kozana on Geopedia

Populated places in the Municipality of Brda